Rubus randolphiorum is a rare North American species of brambles in the rose family. It grows in the southeastern United States (Florida, Alabama, Georgia, Virginia, and the Carolinas). Nowhere is it very common.

The genetics of Rubus is extremely complex, so that it is difficult to decide on which groups should be recognized as species. There are many rare species with limited ranges such as this. Further study is suggested to clarify the taxonomy.

References

randolphiorum
Plants described in 1943
Flora of the Southeastern United States
Flora without expected TNC conservation status